Penal Servitude is a 1928 Soviet silent drama film directed by Yuli Raizman.

Cast
 Andrei Zhilinsky as Ilya Berts  
 Pavel Tamm as Peshekhonov 
 Vladimir Popov as Chernyak  
 Vladimir Taskin as Illarion Ostrobeylo  
 Mikhail Yanshin as Telegraphist  
 Boris Lifanov as Katulsky

References

Bibliography 
 Christie, Ian & Taylor, Richard. The Film Factory: Russian and Soviet Cinema in Documents 1896-1939. Routledge, 2012.

External links 
 
 https://www.imdb.com/title/tt0019051/?ref_=nv_sr_srsg_0

1928 films
1928 drama films
Soviet drama films
Russian drama films
Soviet silent films
1920s Russian-language films
Films directed by Yuli Raizman
Soviet black-and-white films
Russian silent films
Russian black-and-white films
Silent drama films